SAM domain and HD domain-containing protein 1 is a protein that in humans is encoded by the SAMHD1 gene. SAMHD1 is a cellular enzyme, responsible for blocking replication of HIV in dendritic cells, macrophages, monocytes and resting CD4+ T lymphocytes. It is an enzyme that exhibits phosphohydrolase activity, converting deoxynucleoside triphosphates (dNTPs) to inorganic phosphate (iPPP) and a 2'-deoxynucleoside (i.e. deoxynucleosides without a phosphate group). In doing so, SAMHD1 depletes the pool of dNTPs available to a reverse transcriptase for viral cDNA synthesis and thus prevents viral replication. SAMHD1 has also shown nuclease activity. Although a ribonuclease activity was described to be required for HIV-1 restriction, recent data confirmed that SAMHD1-mediated HIV-1 restriction in cells does not involve ribonuclease activity.

Nomenclature 

The SAMHD1 protein is also known as:
 AGS5: Aicardi- Goutières syndrome type 5
 DCIP: Dendritic cell-derived IFNG-induced protein2
 Mg21: Interferon-gamma-inducible protein
 HDDC1: HD domain containing 1
 MOP-5: Monocyte protein 5
 SAMH1_HUMAN
 SBBI88
 CHBL2

Gene 

The gene encoding human SAMHD1 was originally identified in a human dendritic cell cDNA library as an orthologue of a mouse gene IFN-γ-induced gene Mg11. The SAMHD1 gene is located on chromosome 20. SAMHD1 spans 59,532 bp of genomic sequence (chromosome 20:34,954,059–35,013,590) in 16 exons and encodes a 626 amino-acid (aa) protein with a molecular weight of 72.2 kDa. SAMHD1 expressed in both cycling and noncycling cells, but the antiviral activity of SAMHD1 is limited to noncycling cells.

Structure 

The SAMHD1 is 626 amino acids (aa) long and has 2 domains:

a.	Sterile alpha motif (SAM) domain: residues 45 – 110 aa. In general, SAM domains are known to function as protein–protein and protein–nucleic acid interactions in organisms from yeast to humans, docking sites for kinases, signal transduction and regulation of transcription.

b.	Histidine- Aspartic (HD) domain-containing protein 1: residues 164 – 319 aa. HD domains proteins are characterized by a doublet of histidine and aspartic acid catalytic residues, and have been shown to possess putative nuclease, dGTP triphosphatase, phosphatase or phosphodiesterase activities.

A crystal structure of a SAMHD1 fragment comprising catalytic core reveals that the protein is dimeric. Also studies have shown that SAMHD1 oligomerizes and forms tetramers. SAMHD1 is phosphorylated on residue T592 in cycling cells but that this phosphorylation is lost when cells are in a noncycling state.

Function 

Mutations in SAMHD1 are found in Aicardi–Goutières syndrome (AGS), “a hereditary autoimmune encephalopathy that is characterized by aberrant production of type I interferon (IFN) and symptoms mimicking congenital viral infection”. Monocytes isolated from individuals with AGS are highly susceptible to HIV-1.

SAMHD1 was identified as a host protein that is bound and blocked by lentiviral protein, Vpx. Vpx promotes macrophage and DC infection by targeting SAMHD1.

The human SAMHD1 protein has dNTP triphosphatase activity, specifically dGTP-stimulated dNTP triphosphohydrolase activity, and nuclease activity against single-stranded DNA and RNA which is associated with its HD domain. Other studies demonstrated that silencing SAMHD1 enhanced HIV-1 and SIV Δvpx infection of myeloid cells, also enhances HIV-1 infection of resting CD4+ T cells.

Role in disease

Aicardi-Goutieres syndrome 

16 mutations in the SAMHD1 gene have been identified in patients with Aicardi-Goutieres syndrome. Mutations result in a SAMHD1 less functional protein. However, it is not known how this protein dysfunction leads to immune system abnormalities, inflammatory damage to the brain and skin, and other characteristics of this syndrome.

Restriction of viral infection 

SAMHD1 was identified as the cellular protein responsible of the reverse transcription block to HIV-1 infection observed in myeloid cells as well as in quiescent CD4+ T cells. SAMHD1 inhibits HIV-1 infection in myeloid cells by limiting the intracellular pool of dNTPs. The dNTP triphosphohydrolase activity of SAMHD1 has been proposed to reduce the intracellular dNTP level, restricting HIV-1 replication and preventing activation of the immune system, a nuclease activity against single-stranded (ss)DNAs and RNAs, as well as against RNA in DNA/RNA hybrids. Retroviral restriction ability of SAMHD1 is regulated by phosphorylation, for this purpose SAMHD1 associates with the cyclin A2/CDK1 complex that mediates its phosphorylation at threonine 592. Phosphorylated SAMHD1 has been observed to have minimal to no activity in cycling cells. Conversely, unphosphorylated SAMHD1 in non-cycling cells have potent restriction activity.

Expression modulation and antimetabolite degradation in cancer cells 

SAMHD1 protein expression can be influenced at four levels in cancer cells. First, mutations in the SAMHD1 gene can prevent SAMHD1 mRNA generation or a functional protein after translations.   Second, promoter methylation can prevent SAMHD1 mRNA transcription. Third, miRNA-155 and miRNA-181a can prevent the translation, thus preventing protein production. Finally, SAMHD1 degradation occurs during the S phase of the cell cycle.  Non-adherent tumor cell lines – B cells, T cells and myeloid cells can be rapidly dividing cells, have low to no detectable levels of SAMHD1 protein, as compared to adherent cells.
Regulation of dNTP concentration by SAMHD1 in cancer cells might be an important mechanism with therapeutic implications. Antimetabolites are anticancer nucleosides, nucleotides, and base analogs used as anticancer agents to promote cell death by several different mechanisms of action.  For some of these antimetabolites, the intracellular triphosphate form of the analog is the active compound. SAMHD1 has been shown to be able to hydrolyze arabinose 5’-triphosphates.  SAMHD1 has been shown to be a biomarker and influence arabinose C (ara-C; cytarabine) responsiveness. Viral protein x (Vpx) has been proposed to be potential therapy to improve cytarabine therapy for hematological malignancies.

References

Further reading

External links 
  GeneReviews/NCBI/NIH/UW entry on Aicardi-Goutières Syndrome
  OMIM entries on Aicardi-Goutieres syndrome